Mangum may refer to:

Mangum (surname)
Mangum, Oklahoma
Mangum Mound Site